Ang It-hong (30 October 1927 – 24 February 2010) was a Taiwanese popular singer, songwriter, composer, and actor.

Ang was born Hong Wen-lu and educated in Taipei. At a young age, Hong learned to sing and play violin. He first performed at Taihoku City Public Auditorium as part of a children's group, and later as a singer of Japanese patriotic songs. Inspired by Haruo Oka, Hong quit his job at a lumber mill to become a singer, writing his first song, Butterfly in Love with a Flower, aged 19 in 1946 under the stage name Hong Wen-chang. He led a group of singers that performed frequently near the Danshui River until the February 28 Incident forced Hong to move to Tainan. Hong began singing on the radio in 1948, alongside  and others. His radio performances drove his popularity, and, in 1957, he released his debut album A Handsome Young Man on a Hilltop, under his best known stage name Ang It-hong, which was suggested by a fortune teller. His first album featured Hokkien lyrics set to Japanese melodies. Most of his works are songs in Hokkien. Ang's music frequently fused enka with jazz. He worked closely with lyricist  on songs such as Memories of an Old Love and The One Adored. Ang appeared in the 1962 film Love Never Ceases, which featured the song Memories of an Old Love and several others written by Ang, which appeared on his second album Endless Love, featuring original melodies. Ang spent the late 1960s and 1970s in Japan, as Kuomintang authorities censored Hokkien pop and other media. As restrictions against Hokkien media were lifted in the 1980s, and martial law was suspended, one of Ang's students, Jody Chiang, rose to stardom. Ang also wrote songs for his son Chris.

By the time of his death, Ang had over 200 compositions to his name. Ang died from pancreatic cancer on 24 February 2010 at Taipei Medical University Hospital. His funeral was held on 13 March. He was posthumously awarded a Golden Melody Award for Special Contributions in June 2010. A virtual museum was set up in April 2011 to memorialize Ang's life and career. Ang's three sons produced and released a musical documentary about their father later that year.

References

External links

1927 births
2010 deaths
Taiwanese people of Hoklo descent
Taiwanese male film actors
Taiwanese Christians
Taiwanese composers
20th-century Taiwanese male singers
Taiwanese male singer-songwriters
Taiwanese Hokkien pop singers
Musicians from Tainan
Enka singers
Deaths from pancreatic cancer
Deaths from cancer in Taiwan
Male actors from Tainan
Japanese-language singers